Chalise (pronounced: /cha.li.se/)  is a Khas Hindu family name found in Nepal. People with this name are mostly members of the Bahun (Brahmin) caste. According to legend, some priests of Bhattarai caste completed forty ('chalis' in Nepali) chapters of pujas without dropping a single drop of water from their palm. They were then honored with the title Chalise.They also belong from the royal families.

Notable people
Ramesh Vikal Rameshwor Sharma Chalise better known as Ramesh Bikal (Nepali: रमेश बिकल) (born 1932–2008, near Gokarna, Nepal in the Kathmandu Valley) is a Nepalese writer and painter who is known for his works portraying rural life and the lives of common people in Nepal.[1]

He received a B.Ed. in 1960, and worked in education. His early stories had socialist and anti-establishment themes. As a result, he was imprisoned three times between 1949 and 1960. In more recent work, he has focused on sexual relations.[2]

Bikal was the first short story writer to be given the Madan Puraskar award.[2] He received the Daulat Bikram Bista Aakhyan Samman Award in 2008 for six decades of contributions to fiction writing in Nepal.[3]

In tribute to his memory, Ramesh Vikal Literary Foundation has been established at Arubari, Gokarneshwor.[4]

Works
Birano Deshma ("In an Empty Land"), 1959
Naya Sadak ko Geet ("The Song of New Road"), 1962
13 Ramaila Kathaharu ("Thirteen Enjoyable Stories"), 1967
Aaja Feri Arko Tanna Ferincha ("Today Yet Another Bedspread is Changed"), 1967
Euta Budo Violin Aashawari ko Dhoon ma ("An Old Violin in the Ashāvari Tune"), 1968
Agenāko Ḍilmā ("On the Edge of the Hearth"), 1968
Urmilā Bhāujū ("Sister-in-Law Urmilā"), 1968
21 Ramālilā Kathāharū ("Twenty-one Enjoyable Stories"), 1968[2]
Mangal Grahama Bigyan("Bigyan(Science) in Mars")
Abiral Bagdachha Indrawati ("Indrawati flows continuously")
Bhola Nath Chalise (1951–2015), Nepalese economist 
Chakrapani Chalise (1883–1958), Nepalese writer
Janak Kumari Chalise, Nepalese politician

References

Ramesh Vikal Rameshwor Sharma Chalise better known as Ramesh Bikal (Nepali: रमेश बिकल) (born 1932–2008, near Gokarna, Nepal in the Kathmandu Valley) is a Nepalese writer and painter who is known for his works portraying rural life and the lives of common people in Nepal.[1]

He received a B.Ed. in 1960, and worked in education. His early stories had socialist and anti-establishment themes. As a result, he was imprisoned three times between 1949 and 1960. In more recent work, he has focused on sexual relations.[2]

Bikal was the first short story writer to be given the Madan Puraskar award.[2] He received the Daulat Bikram Bista Aakhyan Samman Award in 2008 for six decades of contributions to fiction writing in Nepal.[3]

In tribute to his memory, Ramesh Vikal Literary Foundation has been established at Arubari, Gokarneshwor.[4]

Works
Birano Deshma ("In an Empty Land"), 1959
Naya Sadak ko Geet ("The Song of New Road"), 1962
13 Ramaila Kathaharu ("Thirteen Enjoyable Stories"), 1967
Aaja Feri Arko Tanna Ferincha ("Today Yet Another Bedspread is Changed"), 1967
Euta Budo Violin Aashawari ko Dhoon ma ("An Old Violin in the Ashāvari Tune"), 1968
Agenāko Ḍilmā ("On the Edge of the Hearth"), 1968
Urmilā Bhāujū ("Sister-in-Law Urmilā"), 1968
21 Ramālilā Kathāharū ("Twenty-one Enjoyable Stories"), 1968[2]
Mangal Grahama Bigyan("Bigyan(Science) in Mars")
Abiral Bagdachha Indrawati ("Indrawati flows continuously")

Surnames of Nepalese origin
Nepali-language surnames
Khas surnames